Plainsboro Center is an unincorporated community and census-designated place (CDP) located within Plainsboro Township, in Middlesex County, New Jersey, United States. As of the 2010 United States Census, the CDP's population was 2,712.

Geography
According to the United States Census Bureau, the CDP had a total area of 0.762 square miles (1.975 km2), including 0.759 square miles (1.966 km2) of land and 0.003 square miles (0.008 km2) of water (0.42%).

Demographics

Census 2010

Census 2000
As of the 2000 United States Census there were 2,209 people, 1,026 households, and 572 families living in the CDP. The population density was 1,273.0/km2 (3,284.7/mi2). There were 1,089 housing units at an average density of 627.6/km2 (1,619.3/mi2). The racial makeup of the CDP was 53.19% White, 4.75% African American, 0.05% Native American, 38.89% Asian, 0.95% from other races, and 2.17% from two or more races. Hispanic or Latino of any race were 4.21% of the population.

There were 1,026 households, out of which 29.1% had children under the age of 18 living with them, 48.8% were married couples living together, 5.2% had a female householder with no husband present, and 44.2% were non-families. 37.8% of all households were made up of individuals, and 1.8% had someone living alone who was 65 years of age or older. The average household size was 2.15 and the average family size was 2.90.

In the CDP the population was spread out, with 21.9% under the age of 18, 7.3% from 18 to 24, 51.1% from 25 to 44, 16.3% from 45 to 64, and 3.4% who were 65 years of age or older. The median age was 32 years. For every 100 females, there were 107.6 males. For every 100 females age 18 and over, there were 107.1 males.

The median income for a household in the CDP was $70,759, and the median income for a family was $81,201. Males had a median income of $70,110 versus $42,500 for females. The per capita income for the CDP was $36,555. About 4.8% of families and 3.8% of the population were below the poverty line, including 3.6% of those under age 18 and 35.8% of those age 65 or over.

Nearby historic communities
 Blackwells Mills in Franklin Township (Somerset County)
 Blawenburg in Montgomery Township
 Clarksburg in Millstone Township
 Dayton in South Brunswick
 The Estate of Duke Farms in Hillsborough
 Dutch Neck in West Windsor Township
 Griggstown in Franklin Township (Somerset County)
 Harlingen in Montgomery Township
 Kingston in Franklin Township (Somerset County) and South Brunswick
 Lawrenceville in Lawrence Township (Mercer County)
 The Livingston Avenue Historic District in New Brunswick
 Marlboro in Marlboro Township, along with a detailed list of Historic Sites in Marlboro Township
 The Monmouth Battlefield Historic District in Freehold Township and Manalapan Township
 Monmouth Junction in South Brunswick
 Perrineville in Millstone Township
 The Princeton Battlefield Historic District in Princeton
 Princeton Junction in West Windsor Township
 The Road Up Raritan Historic District in Piscataway
 Tennent in Manalapan Township
 West Freehold in Freehold Township

References

Census-designated places in Middlesex County, New Jersey
Plainsboro Township, New Jersey